Hassamu-Minami Station (発寒南駅) is a Sapporo Municipal Subway station in Nishi-ku, Sapporo, Hokkaido, Japan. The station number is T02.

Platforms

Surrounding area
 Hassamu-Chūō Station, JR Hokkaido
 Hassamu-Minami city bus terminal
 Nishimachi-west Police station
 Sapporo-Kita Post Office
 Maxvalu supermarket, Express Hassamu-Minami station store
 Seiyu Supermarket, West branch
 Sapporo City Agricultural Cooperative Association (JA Sapporo), West branch
 North Pacific Bank, West Branch
 Sapporo Shinkin Bank, Tsukisamu branch
 Rumoi Shinkin Bank, Sapporo Branch

Gallery

External links

 Sapporo Subway Stations

Railway stations in Japan opened in 1999
Railway stations in Sapporo
Sapporo Municipal Subway